Twenty Plus Two (a.k.a. It Started in Tokyo) is a 1961 American mystery film directed by Joseph M. Newman and starring David Janssen, Jeanne Crain, and Dina Merrill. The film adapted Frank Gruber's 1961 novel of the same title.

Plot
Tom Alder (Janssen) is a private investigator who specializes in helping families locate lost heirs. He is intrigued by the disappearance of 16-year-old Doris Delaney who went missing from school 13 years earlier.

Prompted by a Los Angeles police friend to poke his nose into the murder of a movie star's fan club secretary, he discovers a possible connection to Delaney that police had missed. The investigation brings him back into the sphere of Linda Foster (Crain) an old love of Alder who sent Alder a Dear John letter while he was serving in the Korean War. In spite of being engaged to a wealthy and influential man, Foster begins to pursue him. She ends up competing with her friend for Alder's attention. 

While on a plane, Alder meets a young woman named Nikki Kovacs (Merrill), and sensing something familiar about her, starts a conversation with her. He is approached by Frenchy Pleschette, a man who tries to hire him to find his missing younger brother. Alder eventually remembers meeting Kovacs in Japan, who at the time, called herself Lily Brown while he was recuperating from a combat wound. Soon it's revealed that she is the missing heiress Doris Delaney, who had become involved with a man who had raped her and made her pregnant and whom she thought she had shot and killed. She had run away to Japan to avoid disgracing her family. Alder's investigations establish Dane as the killer of both his secretary, the man whom Doris thought she had murdered and as the brother of Pleschette. In a showdown between the two, Pleschette kills his brother Dane after which Alder resumes the romance he started with Doris in Japan.

Agnes Moorehead and William Demarest appear in supporting roles, each for one scene with Janssen.

Cast

David Janssen as Tom Alder
Jeanne Crain as Linda Foster
Dina Merrill as Nicki Kovacs
Agnes Moorehead as Mrs. Eleanor Delaney
Brad Dexter as Leroy Dane
Robert Strauss as Jimmy Honsinger
Jacques Aubuchon as Jacques Pleschette
William Demarest as Desmond Slocum
George N. Neise as Walter Collinson
Fredd Wayne as Harris Toomey
Carleton Young as Colonel
Robert H. Harris as Stanley
Billy Varga as Mark

Critical reception
Allmovie called it a "talkative but interesting murder mystery."

References

External links 

 

Film noir
1961 films
1960s mystery films
American mystery films
Allied Artists films
Films directed by Joseph M. Newman
Films scored by Gerald Fried
1960s English-language films
1960s American films